The Kashenyi–Mitooma Road is a road in the Western Region of Uganda, connecting the town of Kashenyi in Bushenyi District with the town of Mitooma in Mitooma District.

Location
The coordinates of the road, about  out of Mitooma Town are 0°36'47.0"S 30°04'59.0"E (Latitude:-0.613056; Longitude:30.083056).

Upgrading to bitumen
In 2017, the government of Uganda, hired Chongqing International Construction Corporation (CICO), at a contract price of USh49.199 billion (about US$13.5 million) to upgrade the road from gravel surface to class II bitumen surface and the building of bridges and drainage channels.

Overview
The tarmacked road is expected to ease transport within the  districts of Bushenyi, Mitooma, Rubirizi and Sheema, collectively referred to as Greater Bushenyi. The area is heavily involved in agriculture, both on a subsistence level and increasingly on a commercial level. Agriculture employs nearly 87 percent of the population of the aforementioned districts.

Crops grown in the area on a commercial basis include tea, coffee, matooke, bananas. In addition hybrid cattle are raised in the area for both milk and meat production.

Timeline
Work on the road project started on 31 January 2017. Completion was achieved on 16 January 2019. The one year Defects Liability Period ended in January 2020 and the Uganda National Roads Authority (UNRA) issued a completion certificate to the contractor.

See also

 Economy of Uganda
 Transport in Uganda
 List of roads in Uganda

References

External links
 Compensation Delays Work on Kashenyi-Mitooma Road As of 20 April 2018.
 Uganda National Road Authority Homepage

Roads in Uganda
Bushenyi District
Mitooma District
Western Region, Uganda
Transport infrastructure completed in 2019
2019 establishments in Uganda